Grapholita is a large genus of tortrix moths (family Tortricidae). It belongs to subfamily Olethreutinae, and therein to the tribe Grapholitini, of which it is the type genus.

Taxonomy and systematics
Georg Friedrich Treitschke established Grapholita in 1829 – in the 7th volume of Schmetterlinge von Europa, with a type species he claimed to be "Pyralis dorsana", a taxon established by Johan Christian Fabricius in his 1775 Systema Entomologiae. But Treitschke was misled by Jacob Hübner's misidentification of Fabricius' moth.

The actual P. dorsana is today known as Dichrorampha petiverella, as it had already been described by Carl Linnaeus in his 1758 edition of Systema Naturae as Phalaena (Tinea) petiverella. The "Pyralis dorsana" of Hübner and Treitschke was subsequently identified as the species described as Tortrix lunulana by Michael Denis and Ignaz Schiffermüller in 1775, which thus is today Grapholita lunulana.

Species
Grapholita currently has 126 recognised species, though the genus' distinctness from and delimitation against Cydia is in need of further study:

 Grapholita amictana (Felder & Rogenhofer, 1875)
 Grapholita amphitorna (Turner, 1916)
 Grapholita andabatana (Wolff, 1957)
 Grapholita angleseana (Kearfott, 1907)
 Grapholita antitheta (Meyrick, 1911)
 Grapholita arcia Diakonoff, 1988
 Grapholita arcuatana Kuznetzov, 1992
 Grapholita astrapephora Diakonoff, 1976
 Grapholita aureolana Tengstrom, 1848
 Grapholita auroscriptana Caradja, 1916
 Grapholita bigeminata (Meyrick in Caradja & Meyrick, 1935)
 Grapholita biserialis (Meyrick in Caradja & Meyrick, 1935)
 Grapholita boulderana McDunnough, 1942
 Grapholita caecana Schläger, 1848
 Grapholita caeruleana Walsingham, 1879
 Grapholita callisphena (Meyrick, 1907)
 Grapholita caudicula Diakonoff, 1975
 Grapholita cerasivora (Matsumura, 1917)
 Grapholita chrysacrotoma Diakonoff, 1976
 Grapholita comanticosta Kuznetzov, 1988
 Grapholita compositella – clover seed moth
 Grapholita conficitana (Walker, 1863)
 Grapholita conversana Walsingham, 1879
 Grapholita coronillana Lienig & Zeller, 1846
 Grapholita cotoneastri Danilevsky in Danilevsky & Kuznetsov, 1968
 Grapholita curviphalla Liu & Yan, 1998
 Grapholita cyanogona (Meyrick, 1907)
 Grapholita dactyla Liu & Yan, 1998
 Grapholita decolorana Walker, 1863 
 Grapholita delineana Walker, 1863
 Grapholita diaphorotorna Diakonoff, 1983
 Grapholita difficilana (Walsingham, 1900)
 Grapholita dilectabilis Kuznetzov, 1972
 Grapholita dimorpha Komai, 1979
 Grapholita discretana Wocke in Staudinger & Wocke, 1861
 Grapholita dohrniana Zeller, 1863
 Grapholita dyarana (Kearfott, 1907)
 Grapholita dysaethria Diakonoff, 1982
 Grapholita eclipsana Zeller, 1875
 Grapholita edwardsiana (Kearfott, 1907)
 Grapholita endrosias (Meyrick, 1907)
 Grapholita exigua Kuznetzov, 1972
 Grapholita fana (Kearfott, 1907)
 Grapholita fimana Snellen, 1883
 Grapholita fissana (Frölich, 1828)
 Grapholita fistularis (Meyrick, 1928)
 Grapholita floricolana (Meyrick, 1881)
 Grapholita funebrana – plum fruit moth
 Grapholita geministriata (Walsingham, 1900)
 Grapholita gemmiferana Treitschke, 1835
 Grapholita globella Liu & Yan, 1998
 Grapholita globovalva Liu & Yan, 1998
 Grapholita glycyrrhizana (Kuznetzov in Danilevsky, Kuznetsov & Falkovitsh, 1962)
 Grapholita gypsothicta (Meyrick, 1938)
 Grapholita hamatana Kennel, 1901
 Grapholita heptatoma Diakonoff, 1976
 Grapholita hieroglyphana Blanchard & Knudson, 1984
 Grapholita hyalitis (Meyrick, 1909)
 Grapholita hylophanes (Meyrick, 1928)
 Grapholita hymenosa Razowski, 2013
 Grapholita imitativa Heinrich, 1926
 Grapholita inopinata Heinrich, 1928
 Grapholita internana
 Grapholita interstinctana (Clemens, 1860)
 Grapholita iridescens (Meyrick, 1881)
 Grapholita isacma (Meyrick, 1907)
 Grapholita janthinana (Duponchel in Godart, 1835)
 Grapholita jesonica (Matsumura, 1931)
 Grapholita jucundata Kuznetzov, 1971
 Grapholita junctistrigana (Walsingham, 1900)
 Grapholita jungiella
 Grapholita komaii Rose & Pooni, 2003
 Grapholita kurilana Kuznetzov, 1976
 Grapholita lana (Kearfott, 1907)
 Grapholita larseni Rebel, 1903
 Grapholita latens Kuznetzov, 1972
 Grapholita latericia Komai, 1999
 Grapholita lathyrana (Hübner, [1813])
 Grapholita libertina Heinrich, 1926
 Grapholita limbata Diakonoff, 1969
 Grapholita lobarzewskii (Nowicki, 1860)
 Grapholita lunatana Walsingham, 1879
 Grapholita lunulana (Denis & Schiffermüller, 1775)
 Grapholita macrodrilus Diakonoff, 1984
 Grapholita melicrossis (Meyrick, 1932)
 Grapholita mesoscia Diakonoff, 1969
 Grapholita miranda (Meyrick, 1911)
 Grapholita molesta – Oriental fruit moth, peach moth
 Grapholita namatophora Diakonoff, 1976
 Grapholita nebritana Treitschke in Ochsenheimer, 1830
 Grapholita nigrostriana Snellen, 1883
 Grapholita nucleana Felder & Rogenhofer, 1875
 Grapholita obliqua Diakonoff, 1982
 Grapholita okui Komai, 1999
 Grapholita omittana Kuznetzov, 1988
 Grapholita optica (Meyrick, 1912)
 Grapholita opulentica Kuznetzov, 1992
 Grapholita orbiapex Kuznetzov, 1988
 Grapholita orobana Treitschke in Ochsenheimer, 1830
 Grapholita packardi Zeller, 1875
 Grapholita pagenstecheri Bradley, 1961
 Grapholita pallifrontana
 Grapholita parvisignana (Meyrick, 1881)
 Grapholita patens Kuznetzov, 1971
 Grapholita pavonana (Walsingham, 1900)
 Grapholita prolopha (Meyrick, 1912)
 Grapholita prunivora (Walsh, 1868)
 Grapholita pycnograpta (Meyrick, 1936)
 Grapholita rhabdotacra Diakonoff, 1969
 Grapholita rosana Danilevsky in Danilevsky & Kuznetsov, 1968
 Grapholita schizodelta Diakonoff, 1982
 Grapholita scintillana Christoph, 1882
 Grapholita seclusana (Walker, 1866)
 Grapholita semifusca Kuznetzov in Danilevsky & Kuznetsov, 1968
 Grapholita shadawana Liu & Chen, 2000
 Grapholita siderocosma Diakonoff, 1978
 Grapholita sporosema (Meyrick, 1922)
 Grapholita steringus Diakonoff, 1983
 Grapholita tenebrosana Duponchel in Godart, 1842
 Grapholita tetrazancla (Turner, 1925)
 Grapholita thermopsidis Eiseman & Austin, 2020
 Grapholita tornosticha (Turner, 1946)
 Grapholita torodetta (Meyrick, 1914)
 Grapholita tricyanitis Dianokoff, 1976
 Grapholita tristriatana Pagenstecher, 1900
 Grapholita tristrigana (Clemens, 1865)
 Grapholita valens Kuznetzov, 1988
 Grapholita vitrana Walsingham, 1879
 Grapholita yasudai Komai, 1999
 Grapholita zapyrana (Meyrick, 1881)
 Grapholita zariae Razowski, 2013

Synonyms
Obsolete scientific names (junior synonyms and others) of Grapholita are:

 Aspila Stephens, 1834
 Coptoloma Lederer, 1859
 Ebisma Walker, 1866
 Endopisa Guenée, 1845
 Endopsia (lapsus)
 Endopiza (lapsus)
 Ephippiophora (lapsus)
 Ephippiphora Duponchel, 1834
 Eudopisa (lapsus)
 Euspila Stephens, 1834
 Grapholitha Treitschke, 1830 (unjustified emendation)
 Grapholltha (lapsus)
 Opadia Guenée, 1845
 Stigmonota Guenée, 1845

Footnotes

References

  (2009a): Online World Catalogue of the Tortricidae – Genus Grapholita account. Version 1.3.1. Retrieved 20 January 2009.
  (2009b): Online World Catalogue of the Tortricidae – Grapholita species list. Version 1.3.1. Retrieved 20 January 2009.
  (2009c): Online World Catalogue of the Tortricidae – Dichrorampha petiverella. Version 1.3.1. Retrieved 19 April 2009.
  (2005a): Markku Savela's Lepidoptera and Some Other Life Forms – Cydia. Version of 13 September 2005. Retrieved 19 April 2010.
  (2005b): Markku Savela's Lepidoptera and Some Other Life Forms – Grapholita. Version of 13 September 2005. Retrieved 19 April 2010.
  (1829): [Genus Grapholita]. In: Die Schmetterlinge von Europa (Siebenter Band. Zünsler. G[enera] Herminia-Ennychia.): 232. Gerhard Fleischer, Leipzig. Fulltext at the Internet Archive

Grapholitini
Tortricidae genera
Taxa named by Georg Friedrich Treitschke